The Rochester Bronchos were a minor league baseball team based in Rochester, New York, from 1899 to 1911.

In 1899, the franchise was purchased by a syndicate of local businessmen doing business as the "Flower City Baseball Company": George W. Sweeney, the president of the Rochester Trotting Association, John Nash, F. E.Youngs, Edward F. Higgins, and John H. Callahan, and the team was renamed the Bronchos. The owners hired Al Buckenberger as manager, and, despite having been a last-place team the previous year, the Bronchos won the Eastern League title.

In 1903, the nickname was changed to Beau Brummels. However, the team's fortunes did not improve, and the 1904 Beau Brummels were named the worst team in Rochester history, with a record of 28-105. In 1909, the Bronchos again managed to go from last to first, improving from 55-82 to 90-61. They won the pennant the next two years as well, with 92-61 and 98-54 seasons.

Buckenberger returned to the Bronchos in 1905, but the team continued to flounder. In 1908, he was summarily fired during a game and replaced by the shortstop, Eddie Holly. In 1909, John "Big Jawn" Ganzel became the manager, and the team was renamed the Rochester Hustlers. The move was a success, with the team winning three straight Eastern League pennants in 1909–1911. In 1909, the team bore the nickname Camels.

Until 1908, the team played at Culver Field. That year, they moved to the newly constructed "Baseball Park".

See also
 List of baseball parks in Rochester, New York

References

External links
 Slagle Climbs a Hill

Defunct Eastern League (1938–present) teams
Professional baseball teams in New York (state)
Defunct baseball teams in New York (state)
Defunct International League teams
Bronchos
Baseball teams disestablished in 1911
Baseball teams established in 1899